Carebara castanea is a species of ant from the Myrmicinae subfamily. The scientific name of this species was first published in 1858 by Smith. It is found in Thailand, Laos, and China.

Carebara castanea is consumed by humans in northern Thailand. It is locally known as maeng man (แมงมัน), or subterranean ant.

References

External links

Myrmicinae
Insects described in 1858